John Manton (born 18 April 1963) is  a former Australian rules footballer who played with Richmond in the Victorian Football League (VFL).

Notes

External links 		
		
		
		
		
		
		
Living people		
1963 births		
		
Australian rules footballers from Victoria (Australia)		
Richmond Football Club players